Capture/Release is the debut album by The Rakes, released on 15 August 2005. The album peaked at number 32 on the UK. NME named it the 13th best album of 2005 and it received a generally positive critical response. It was released in the US on 18 April 2006 with the additional track "All Too Human".

Track listing
All songs written by Alan Donohoe, Jamie Hornsmith, Lasse Petersen and Matthew Swinnerton.
"Strasbourg" – 2:30
"Retreat" – 2:58
"22 Grand Job" – 1:46
"Open Book" – 2:17
"The Guilt" – 3:47
"Binary Love" – 3:45
"We Are All Animals" – 4:08
"Violent" – 2:34
"T Bone" – 3:36
"Terror!" – 2:54
"Work, Work, Work (Pub, Club, Sleep)" – 4:07
"All Too Human" (US release) – 3:30

Japanese bonus tracks
 "Wish You Were Here" – 2:13
 "Automaton" – 2:00

Personnel
Alan Donohoe – vocals
Jamie Hornsmith – bass guitar
Lasse Petersen – drums
Matthew Swinnerton – lead guitar

References

2005 debut albums
The Rakes albums
V2 Records albums
Albums produced by Paul Epworth